Tillandsia crocata is a species in the genus Tillandsia. This species is native to Brazil, Bolivia, Argentina, Paraguay and Uruguay.

Cultivars
 Tillandsia 'Rutschmann's Orange'
 Tillandsia 'Tawny Yellow'

References

crocata
Flora of South America
Plants described in 1882
Taxa named by N. E. Brown
Taxa named by Charles Jacques Édouard Morren